Stephen Perofeta (born 12 March 1997) is a New Zealand rugby union player who currently plays as a fly-half for  in the Mitre 10 Cup. He is also a member of the Blues Super Rugby squad, making his debut towards the end of the 2017 Super Rugby season.

Professional career

New Zealand Under 20s
In June 2017, Perofeta was called in as an emergency replacement for the New Zealand Under 20s rugby side at the World Rugby Under 20s World Championship. He started the final, and kicked seven conversions as New Zealand convincingly beat England 64–17 to win the tournament.

Blues 2017–present

Coming back from injury, Perofeta made his debut as a substitute player against the Queensland Reds in Apia, a match the Blues won 24–19. He scored a try and kicked two conversions, for a total of nine points in his first game. A week later, Perofeta started at first five as the Blues defeated the touring British and Irish Lions at Eden Park 22–16. Perofeta played a key role in the victory, with his beautiful cut-out pass setting up Rieko Ioane for the game's opening try, then his unsuccessful penalty goal attempt lead to a Sonny Bill Williams try (which Perofeta duly converted) to give the Blues the halftime lead.

All Blacks 
Perofeta made his international debut for the All Blacks on 27 August 2022 against Argentina at Christchurch for 50 seconds.

References

External links 

 

 

1997 births
Living people
Taranaki rugby union players
Rugby union fly-halves
Rugby union fullbacks
Moana Pasifika players
Blues (Super Rugby) players
New Zealand rugby union players
Rugby union players from Whanganui
New Zealand international rugby union players
People educated at Whanganui Collegiate School